The LightHouse for the Blind and Visually Impaired is a San Francisco-based nonprofit organization, and is the oldest and largest of its kind in Northern California. The organization offers a wide range of services for the visually challenged in order, according to its mission statement, to "promote the equality and self-reliance of people who are blind or visually impaired through rehabilitation training, employment placement, Enchanted Hills Camp and other relevant services." In 2014, the LightHouse received a $125 million bequest from Seattle construction insurance businessman Donald Sirkin, which is arguably the most sizable donation given to a blindness organization.

History
Founded in 1902 under the direction of Josephine Rowan as the Reading Room for the Blind in the San Francisco Public Library's basement, the LightHouse for the Blind and Visually Impaired has grown out of a series of nonprofit mergers throughout its century-long existence into an organization that provides a wide range of services for the visually challenged in the Bay Area.

In 1914, the organization became the San Francisco Association for the Blind and offered occupational classes in addition to employment opportunities to the blind in the production of brooms, baskets, and furniture. This manufacturing process was known as "Blindcraft" but has been discontinued since 1982.

The Association continued to expand and in 1924 moved to a new facility with the financial support of the Cowell family. The organization continued its manufacturing aspect and began providing braille classes, white cane instruction and counseling. In 1956 a Recreation/Education Center was added to the organization. In 1958 the San Francisco Association and Center merged with another non-profit known as Recreation for the Blind, to become the San Francisco LightHouse for the Blind. This marked the beginning of the LightHouse's involvement with the Enchanted Hills Camp as it belonged to Recreation for the Blind.

In 1993 the LightHouse had yet another merger, this time with the Rose Resnick Center, to become the Rose Resnick Lighthouse for the Blind and Visually Impaired and provide more services for those with blind and low vision. In 2004, the name Rose Resnick was omitted from the organization's title.

Today the LightHouse has multiple locations in Northern California, including, LightHouse Marin, LightHouse North Coast, LightHouse East Bay, Enchanted Hills Camp and LightHouse Industries Sirkin Center.

The LightHouse also maintains a blog and produces podcasts about the concerns and issues of the blind and visually impaired.

Holman Prize
Since 2017 the annual Holman Prize has been awarded "to support the emerging adventurousness and can-do spirit of blind and low vision people worldwide". Entrants must initially upload a 90-second video pitch to YouTube, and this is seen as part of the challenge. Selected applicants are then invited to make written submissions, and a shortlist are interviewed in person.   
Three winners are selected each year, and receive funding of up to $25,000 for an adventurous project which need not involve foreign travel but must "take them out of their comfort zone".

The prize is named for James Holman (1786-1857), a British adventurer and writer who was the first blind person to circumnavigate the earth.

Winners have included:

Headquarters
In 2016, the LightHouse moved into a $45M headquarters at 1155 Market Street in San Francisco. The LightHouse occupies the 9th-11th floors of the building, in a three-story office space designed by blind architect and Board of Directors President Chris Downey together with Mark Cavagnero Associates.

References

External links

Blindness organizations in the United States
Charities based in California